Jarlath Regan (born 1980) is a London-based Irish comedian and podcaster. A former graphic design consultant, he began his stand-up comedy career in 2003 and by the end of 2004 was a finalist for three major UK comedy newcomer awards: So You Think You're Funny, BBC New Comedy Awards and the Chortle Student Comedian of the Year. While attending University College Dublin, he was auditor of the Literary and Historical Society.

Shortly after this he began writing sketches, and material for other comedians and TV shows and established himself as a regular face on the Irish stand-up comedy circuit.

Regan has produced five one man shows for the Edinburgh Festival Fringe, publishing 2 illustrated books, appearing as a regular contributor on radio and television while also performing at comedy festivals worldwide, he is recognised as the leader of a new generation of talented comics emerging from Ireland.

Stand-up shows
Regan began stand-up in the early 2000s. In 2006, he performed as part of the first ever Irish gala at Montreal Just for Laughs.

Regan's shows have included 2007's Edinburgh Fringe show "Nobody Knows... Jarlath Regan", 2018/19's "Organ Freeman", which chronicled his experience as a live-organ donor, and 2019/2020's "Notion's Eleven" which has been recorded in Vicar Street, for DVD release in late 2020.

Television work
Regan wrote and performed sketches on Scope (2007), an Irish science television programme for teenagers and was a regular panellist during the 2008–2009 season of The Panel.

In 2010, Regan co-presented The Rumour Room, a teen entertainment series part of TRTÉ on RTÉ Two television. Some highlights from the series included his interview with Chris Rock and Adam Sandler, a series of comedy sketches in which Regan beat toddlers at physical tests of strength and an in-studio game called "The €21 Challenge" in which Regan forced a child to gamble their pocket money in an unusual game of blackjack.

An Irishman Abroad
In 2013, Regan began An Irishman Abroad, a series of weekly podcasts interviewing Irish people and people of Irish descent  about their lives and gaining insights into the experiences of Irish people abroad, both successes and failures. It won the iTunes Store's award for "Best New Audio Podcast" for 2013.

Most of the guests of the more than 350 episodes have been celebrities from the worlds of comedy (Dara Ó Briain, Jason Byrne, Graham Linehan), sport (Sonia O'Sullivan, Richard Hughes), as well as film and television (Jack Reynor, Aidan Gillen, Paul Mescal).

Some of the guests are successful but not particularly famous, but have a story to tell. In 2014, The Daily Telegraph included the podcast among the "best comedy podcasts", and Niall Byrne of the Irish Independent included it in a list of "world's greatest podcasts". In 2017, Diaspora website IrishCentral.com described the podcast as "some of the best conversations with Irish people you'll ever hear". Pat Carty of Hot Press attributes this success to the non-reliance on a "parade of famous faces". In 2020, Stevie Gallacher of The Sunday Post described the podcast as proof that the Irish have the "gift of the gab".

In 2014, Paul Campbell of The Guardian's "Talking Sport" blog wrote of the Jerry Flannery edition that "every single young person reading this should go download this podcast and listen to it every week for the rest of time".

A justice-themed spin-off series Irishman:Behind Bars was launched in 2019, while a basketball-themed spin-off series, Inside Basketball and US politics-themed series, Irishman In America, were launched in 2020. Irishman Running Abroad also launched in 2020.

The podcast moved to Patreon in August 2020.

See also
 Auditors of the Literary and Historical Society (University College Dublin)

References

1980 births
Living people
Auditors of the Literary and Historical Society (University College Dublin)
Irish male comedians
Irish stand-up comedians
Irish expatriates in the United Kingdom
People from County Kildare
RTÉ television presenters
Irish podcasters
Date of birth missing (living people)
Place of birth missing (living people)